Neagu Bratu (born 4 April 1935) is a Romanian former sports shooter. He competed at the 1964 Summer Olympics and the 1968 Summer Olympics.

References

1935 births
Living people
Romanian male sport shooters
Olympic shooters of Romania
Shooters at the 1964 Summer Olympics
Shooters at the 1968 Summer Olympics
People from Brăila County